The 2012 MENA Golf Tour was the second season of the MENA Golf Tour.

Schedule
The following table lists official events during the 2012 season.

Order of Merit
The Order of Merit was based on prize money won during the season, calculated in U.S. dollars. Max Williams led the amateur Order of Merit.

Notes

References

MENA Golf Tour